Yanghu may refer to

Yanghu, a subdistrict of Yuelu District in Changsha, Hunan.

 towns
 Yanghu, Dongzhi, a town of Dongzhi County in Anhui.
 Yanghu, Huangshan, a town of Tunxi District in Huangshan, Anhui.
 Yanghu, Yingshang, a town of Yingshang County in Anhui.